Buan may refer to:

People
 Noel S. Buan, Philippine army officer

Places
 Buan County, South Korea
 Buan, Gwynedd, United Kingdom
 San Jose de Buan, Philippines

Other
 Botswana University of Agriculture and Natural Resources
 Buan language